Andrej Ivančík (born 25 May 1990) is a Slovak football midfielder who currently plays for the Fortuna Liga club FC Nitra.

References

External links
FC Nitra profile 

1990 births
Living people
Slovak footballers
Association football midfielders
FC Nitra players
FK Slovan Duslo Šaľa players
Slovak Super Liga players
Sportspeople from Nitra